The 1808 United States elections elected the members of the 11th United States Congress. The election took place during the First Party System. In the aftermath of the Embargo of 1807, the Federalists picked up Congressional seats for the first time since their defeat in the 1800 election. However, the Democratic-Republican Party maintained control of the Presidency and both houses of Congress. 

In the Presidential election, Democratic-Republican Secretary of State James Madison easily defeated Federalist Governor Charles Pinckney of South Carolina. Incumbent Vice President George Clinton was re-elected, making him the first vice president to serve under two different presidents.

In the House, Federalists won moderate gains, but Democratic-Republicans continued to dominate the chamber.

In the Senate, Federalists picked up one seat, but Democratic-Republicans retained a dominant majority.

See also
1808 United States presidential election
1808–09 United States House of Representatives elections
1808–09 United States Senate elections

References

1808 elections in the United States
1808